The Midland Railway 990 class was a class of 4-4-0 steam locomotive.  Ten were built by the Midland Railway in 1907–1909, with simple expansion, to compare with the 1000 class compounds, with which they shared many features.  Initially built as saturated, from 1910 to 1914, they were equipped with superheated boilers.  These locomotives were well known for their work North of Leeds, over the demanding Settle and Carlisle route.

Accidents and incidents

On 2 September  1913, locomotive No. 993 was hauling a stalled express passenger train that was involved in a collision with another express at Ais Gill, Westmorland due to the latter passing signals at danger. Sixteen people were killed and 38 were injured.

Withdrawal
They passed to the London, Midland and Scottish Railway (LMS) in 1923 and were withdrawn between 1925 and 1928. in 1926, the eight surviving locomotives were renumbered 801 to 809 to free-up their old numbers for more Compounds. None has survived to preservation, though the first of the compounds has.

See also
 Locomotives of the Midland Railway

References

0990
4-4-0 locomotives
Railway locomotives introduced in 1908
Standard gauge steam locomotives of Great Britain
2′B n2 locomotives
2′B h2 locomotives